Tristan Sauer (born 1920, date of death unknown) was a Swiss water polo player. He competed in the men's tournament at the 1948 Summer Olympics.

References

External links
 

1920 births
Year of death missing
Swiss male water polo players
Olympic water polo players of Switzerland
Water polo players at the 1948 Summer Olympics
Place of birth missing